The Green Hornet is an American action television series broadcast on ABC during the 1966–1967 television season, starring Van Williams as the Green Hornet/Britt Reid and Bruce Lee as Kato. It was produced and narrated by William Dozier.

The single-season series premiered September 9, 1966, and ran through March 17, 1967, lasting 26 episodes; ABC repeated the series after its cancellation by the network, until July 14, 1967, when The Green Hornet had its last broadcast on network television. With the later success of Lee as a premiere star of the martial arts film genre, the series has become a cult favorite.

Plot
Playboy bachelor and media mogul Britt Reid is the owner and publisher of the Daily Sentinel newspaper but, as the masked vigilante Green Hornet, he fights crime with the assistance of his martial arts expert partner, Kato, and his weapons-enhanced car, a custom Imperial called the "Black Beauty". On police records, the Green Hornet is a wanted criminal, but, in reality, the Green Hornet is masquerading as a criminal so that he can infiltrate and battle criminal gangs, leaving them and the incriminating evidence for police arrival. Beyond Kato, Britt's dual identity is known only to his secretary Lenore "Casey" Case and District Attorney Frank P. Scanlon.

Britt's motive for fighting crime was explained on-screen: his father had died in prison after having been framed for a crime he did not commit.

Origin
The character had originated as the star of a radio series (1930s to 1950s), and it had previously been adapted to movie serials, comic books, and other media. Owing in part to George W. Trendle and Fran Striker having created all the central characters and developed the core formats of both radio shows, Britt Reid shares the same family name as the Lone Ranger, as Britt's father had been the Lone Ranger's nephew Dan Reid.

Cast
 Van Williams as Britt Reid/Green Hornetthe owner and publisher of The Daily Sentinel and masked fighting hero, who masquerades as a villain.
 Bruce Lee as KatoBritt Reid's valet and partner, who is also the Green Hornet's aide.
 Wende Wagner as Lenore "Casey" CaseReid's secretary at the Daily Sentinel, one of only two other people who know the true identities of the Green Hornet and Kato.
 Lloyd Gough as Mike Axforda police reporter for the Daily Sentinel.
 Walter Brooke as District Attorney Frank P. Scanlon, the other one of only two other people who know the true identities of the Green Hornet and Kato and knows the Green Hornet is a good guy. 
 William Dozier as The Narrator.

Production

Despite character co-creator George W. Trendle's failed efforts to generate interest in a Green Hornet TV series in 1951 and 1958, it was not until the success of ABC's 1960s Batman series that the network decided to adapt the venerable radio and movie-serial character. The task was taken on by William Dozier who produced and narrated the series. The series stars Van Williams as the Green Hornet and introduced martial artist Bruce Lee to American television audiences as his partner, Kato. 

Unlike the campy and humorous Batman series, The Green Hornet was played straight. Though it was canceled after one season, Lee became a major star of martial arts movies. Lee's popularity in Hong Kong, where he was raised, was such that the show was marketed there as The Kato Show. It was Lee's insistence that Kato be played as a martial artist—rather than an American-style fisticuffs fighter—that pushed the directors to rethink the character's portrayal. The Green Hornet was the first time broad swaths of the American public saw true martial arts fighting, and led to its increasing popularity. Indeed, Van Williams took lessons from Lee so that he could do some of the increasingly popular moves as well.

The Green Hornet and Kato also appear in three episodes of Batman; "The Spell of Tut" (as a brief cameo) and "A Piece of the Action"/"Batman's Satisfaction", with Reid mentioning that he and Bruce Wayne had been acquaintances and rivals since childhood. Though other characters in the story are all led to believe wrongly that the Green Hornet and Kato are villains, as on The Green Hornet, Roger C. Carmel played the real villain, who called himself Colonel Gumm.

Differences from radio version 
As with the later years of the radio version, secretary Lenore "Casey" Case (played by Wende Wagner) is again aware of Reid's secret, and the Hornet also has a confidant within the law enforcement community, but now he is District Attorney Frank P. Scanlon (played by Walter Brooke). This character was changed from the original's police commissioner because the Batman TV series was already using a man in that post as the hero's official contact, and William Dozier, the executive producer of both programs, wanted to downplay comparisons between the two shows. 

Michael Axford (Lloyd Gough), the bodyguard turned reporter of the radio series, is now solely a police reporter for The Daily Sentinel, the newspaper owned by Britt Reid/the Green Hornet. The first episode, "The Silent Gun", provides a connection between the radio and the TV series, as Axford reminds Reid of the "old days" when he lived in the same apartment with Reid's father, which hints that Reid's father may have been the Green Hornet of the radio series. In this series, Reid owned a television station as well.

There were visual differences as well. Promotional artwork for the radio program and the comic books of the day depicted the Hornet wearing a mask that covered all of his face below the eyes (the two Universal Studios Saturday matinee serials contained a full face mask with eye holes) while Kato wore goggles. Here, both men wear masks that cover only the upper portions of their faces. These masks initially had a stylized angularity that soon proved problematic: neither man could see much. They were soon replaced with masks molded to the performers' faces.

In a technological update, the Hornet carried a telescoping device called the Hornet's Sting, which projected ultrasonic soundwaves. He most frequently used it to open locked doors, although he was also seen using it to set things on fire (presumably by vibrating them and causing heat through friction) and to threaten criminals to get information. In the episode "The Secret of the Sally Bell", the Hornet used it to explode the thug's gun, causing the thug to fall and suffer a concussion, resulting in the criminal's being hospitalized. He also had a Hornet knockout gas gun.

The television version Kato used green "sleeve darts" to give him a ranged attack he could use to counter enemies both at a distance and in hand-to-hand combat. The impression Bruce Lee made at the time is demonstrated by Kato's Revenge Featuring the Green Hornet, a TV series tie-in coloring book produced by Watkins & Strathmore.

Theme music and opening 
Nikolai Rimsky-Korsakov's orchestral interlude, "Flight of the Bumblebee", used for the radio series, was so strongly identified with The Green Hornet that a similar, jazz-styled theme modeled after the Rimsky-Korsakov piece was used for the series, arranged by Billy May, who also composed the background scores, and conducted by Lionel Newman, with trumpet solo performed by Al Hirt. Hirt recorded a longer, stereo version of the theme with a somewhat different arrangement for his album "The Horn Meets The Hornet". A similar recording titled "The Green Bee" recorded by trombonist Urbie Green that appears on Green's 21 Trombones album had also been considered as the tv series theme.

Each episode begins with the following monologue, narrated by producer William Dozier

Years later, the version of the theme from "The Horn Meets The Hornet" was featured in the 2003 film Kill Bill, Vol. 1, in which director Quentin Tarantino paid tribute to Kato by featuring the dozens of sword-fighting members of "The Crazy 88" wearing Kato-style masks during one of the film's fight sequences.

Episodes

Crossover with Batman TV series

There were several comparisons and crossovers from Batman to Green Hornet, both on TV and in movies.

The Green Hornet and Kato on Batman 
Van Williams and Bruce Lee make a cameo appearance as the Green Hornet and Kato in "window cameos" while Batman and Robin were climbing a building. This was in part one of a two-part second-season episode of the Batman TV series: "The Spell of Tut", which aired on September 28, 1966. There is also mention of The Green Hornet TV series on the Batman two-part episode "The Impractical Joker", transmitted on November 16, 1966, as Alfred, Dick Grayson and Bruce Wayne are watching television, and Bruce Wayne says, "It's time to watch The Green Hornet!".

Later that same season, the Green Hornet and Kato appeared in the two-part second-season episodes "A Piece of the Action" and "Batman's Satisfaction", which aired on March 1–2, 1967. In the two episodes, the Green Hornet and Kato are in Gotham City to bust a counterfeit stamp ring run by Colonel Gumm (portrayed by Roger C. Carmel). "Batman's Satisfaction" leads up to a mixed fight, with both Batman & Robin and The Green Hornet & Kato fighting Colonel Gumm and his gang. Once Gumm's crew is defeated, Batman and Robin square off against The Green Hornet and Kato, resulting in a stand-off interrupted by the police. In this episode, Batman, Robin and the police consider the Green Hornet and Kato criminals, though Batman and Robin were cordial to the duo in the earlier window appearance.

Batman and Robin on The Green Hornet 
In December 9, 1966 The Green Hornet episode "The Secret Of The Sally Bell" the Batmobile is seen on a television receiver, turning around inside the Batcave. In the February 3, 1967, Green Hornet episode "Ace in the Hole", which was transmitted in between the September 1966 and March 1967 Batman appearances (mentioned above), an unidentified episode of Batman is seen playing on a television set, showing Batman and Robin climbing a building. One other appearance of The Green Hornet, Kato, and Batman was broadcast in Autumn 1966 on a Milton Berle Hollywood Palace television variety show.

Black Beauty 

The TV series featured the Green Hornet's car, The Black Beauty, a 1966 Imperial Crown sedan customized by Dean Jeffries at a cost of US$13,000. Two cars were built for the show and both exist today. Black Beauty 1 is located in the Petersen Automotive Museum collection and Black Beauty 2 has been fully restored and is located in a private collection in South Carolina.

Storage and deployment
The Black Beauty was stored underneath Britt Reid's garage. A set of switches on a secret control panel behind a tool wall would sequentially set the lights to green, attach clamps to the bumpers of Reid's personal car, rotate the floor of the garage – hiding Reid's car (a Chrysler 300 convertible), and bringing up the Black Beauty – finally unclamping the Black Beauty's bumpers. The Black Beauty would then exit the garage through a hidden rear door, and enter the street from behind a billboard advertising the fictitious product Kissin' Candy Mint (with the slogan "How sweet they are") designed to separate down the middle and rejoin.

Weaponry, surveillance, and security features
The Black Beauty, which carried rear license plate number V194, could fire explosive charges from tubes hidden behind retractable panels below the headlights, which were said to be rockets with explosive warheads; it had a concealed-when-not-in-use, drop-down knock-out gas nozzle in the center of the front grille, and the vehicle could launch a small flying video/audio surveillance device (referred to as the scanner) through a small rectangular panel in the middle of the trunk lid. It was a foreshadowing of today's small helicopter-like drones. Working rockets and gas nozzles were incorporated into the trunk lid as well.

Other appearances

Dragon: The Bruce Lee Story

The 1993 American semi-fictionalized film biography of Bruce Lee depicts Lee (Jason Scott Lee) meeting fictional producer Bill Krieger (Robert Wagner) after a martial arts tournament, and being hired to play Kato in The Green Hornet series. The movie shows the fictionalized shooting of the first episode, where cast and crew are impressed by Lee's martial arts skills. Van Williams plays the director of the episode.

Batman '66 Meets the Green Hornet
Kevin Smith and Ralph Garman are co-writers of a Batman and Green Hornet team-up titled Batman '66 Meets the Green Hornet. The issues were drawn by artist Ty Templeton, with covers by Alex Ross. The six-issue miniseries was co-produced by DC Comics (publishers of Batman) and Dynamite Entertainment (current publishers of the Green Hornet titles). The overall story is a sequel to the above-mentioned Batman/Green Hornet two-part TV crossover episodes, reuniting Hornet & Kato with Batman & Robin, and pitting both teams against the now "General Gumm" and his new criminal cohort, the Joker. The series was published both in physical comic book form and in an extended 12-part digital format, splitting each regular issue's material into two digital issues. 

The full series has since been published in a collected volume, both in hardcover and "trade paperback" editions. Garman and Smith have performed dramatized readings of all 6 issues on podcast episodes hosted on Smith's SModcast webpage. The first issue was dramatized in an episode of Smith's Fatman on Batman podcast (episode #66), and the remaining five as episodes of Hollywood Babble-On, co-hosted by Garman and Smith, as special "Hollywood Babble-On Comic-Con Theater" episodes (episodes 175, 180, 184, 188 & 193).

Once Upon a Time in Hollywood

The 2019 film Once Upon a Time in Hollywood has a scene in which stuntman Cliff Booth (Brad Pitt) has a confrontation with Bruce Lee (played by Mike Moh in full Kato gear) on the set of The Green Hornet. In the scene, an impromptu two-out-of-three martial arts match between Booth and Lee takes place, with both men winning one match, but the fight is broken up before the deciding match can finish.

Comics
The series was adapted into a comic strip by Dan Spiegle, distributed by Gold Key Comics.

References

External links

Television
 The Green Hornet and Kato tribute webpage

Other 
 Official Black Beauty site
 The Green Hornet at the International Catalogue of Superheroes
 Catalogue Record for the papers of William Dozier and his production company at the American Heritage Center

1966 American television series debuts
1967 American television series endings
American action adventure television series
American Broadcasting Company original programming
Asian-American television
English-language television shows
Green Hornet
Martial arts television series
Television shows adapted into comics
Television series based on radio series
Television series by 20th Century Fox Television